The 2010 Troy Trojans football team represented Troy University in the 2010 NCAA Division I FBS football season. They played their home games at Movie Gallery Stadium in Troy, Alabama and competed in the Sun Belt Conference. They were led by 20th-year head coach Larry Blakeney. They finished the season with a record of 8–5 (6–2 Sun Belt) to win a share of their fifth consecutive Sun Belt title and a 48–21 victory over Ohio in the New Orleans Bowl.

Schedule

Personnel

Coaching staff
 Larry Blakeney – Head Coach
 Kenny Edenfield – Offensive Coordinator/Inside Receivers
 Jeremy Rowell – Defensive Coordinator/Secondary
 Shane Wasden – Outside Receivers/Special Teams Coordinator
 Eandy Butler – Defensive Ends 
 Maurea Crain – Defensive Line
 Chip Lindsey – Quarterbacks
 Beniy Parker – Linebackers
 John Schlarman – Running Game Coordinator/Offensive Line
 Richard Shaughnessy – Strength and Conditioning

NFL Draft
3rd Round, 83rd Overall Pick by the New York Giants—Sr. WR Jerrel Jernigan

References

Troy
Troy Trojans football seasons
Sun Belt Conference football champion seasons
New Orleans Bowl champion seasons
Troy Trojans football